The Western Wildcats Hockey Club is the oldest field hockey club in Scotland, based in Milngavie.

History

Western, established originally in the West End of Glasgow, played hockey in that district for 70 years, during which time they never succeeded in finding a permanent ground which they could call their home. Nevertheless, they maintained their position as a prominent club in the West of Scotland and were highly regarded throughout Scotland. From the earliest times they have provided many Scottish internationalists.

After the second World War the club continued to prosper, fielding four teams regularly every weekend. But it was in 1968 that the major change occurred when the club became a fully integrated part of Milngavie and Bearsden Sports Club. This was a step of great significance, providing financial stability to the Sports Club and a permanent home for Western. With the requirement that top class hockey be played on artificial surfaces the first privately owned artificial hockey pitch was laid at Auchenhowie in 1994 providing unrivalled facilities to Western players and contributing significantly to the improvement of playing standards throughout the club.

Over the past twenty years or so, Western has promoted a deliberate youth policy to interest local boys and girls in the game of hockey. Coaching has been provided on a regular basis with games and mini tournaments for the various age ranges from 8 year-olds to 17 year-olds. The Junior Section has had a distinguished record with many of these juniors have achieved international recognition at their age levels and now play for the senior sides in the club.

The club now fields six men's teams and three women's each Saturday with occasional games for a veteran side.

Honours

Club Honours

League 

Scottish League championships 

1997,1998,1999, 2000, 2001, 2003, 2004, 2022

Scottish Indoor League Championships

2019, 2022

Cups 

Scottish Cup winners 

1986, 1996, 1998, 1999, 2000, 2003, 2004, 2005, 2011, 2022

League Cup Winners 

2002

Europe

1996 - 1997 B  Divn Cup Winners – Bronze – 3rd - Cardiff

1997 - 1998 C Divn League – Gold -  1st - Milngavie

1998 - 1999 B Divn League – Bronze- 3rd - Milan

1999 -  2000 B Divn League – Gold – 1st - Belfast

2000 - 2001 A Divn League - 5th - Bloemendaal

2001 - 2002 A Divn League - 7th - Antwerp

2002 - 2003 B Divn  Cup Winners – Gold – 1st- Hostivar

2003 - 2004 B Divn League – Gold – 1st -  Prague

2004 - 2005 A Divn League - 7th - Amsterdam

2005 - 2006 A Divn  Cup Winners – 7th – Reading

2006–2007 B Divn Cup Winners – Gold 1st - Prague

2008 -  2009 Euro Hockey League - Group Stage - Lille  

2010 - 2011 European Trophy - 7th - Rome

2021 - 2022 European Trophy II - 2nd - Geneva

2022 - 2023 Euro Hockey League - Group Stage - Hamburg

International Players Past and Present (Since 1985)

Neil Menzies, Hunter R.J., Callaghan M., Aitken J., Niall Sturrock, Gary Thomson, Kevin Squire, Calum  Macleod, Roddy Philp, Kevin Squire, Ritchie Forsyth, Michael Starling, Gordon Moore, Alister MacDougal, Michael Carnaghan, Euan Miller, Vishal Marwaha, Graham Joyce, Stuart McMorrow, Barry Kane, Scott Macartney, Kris Kane, Graham Moodie,  Andrew Sewnauth, Douglas Simpson, David Mitchell, Graham Dunlop, David Mansouri, Joe Simpson, Grant McCallum, Ian Moodie, Gavin Sommerville, Kareena Marshall, Rob Harwood, Andrew McConnell, Joseph McConnell, Hamish Galt, Callum Duke.

Woman's Section

Western Wildcats woman have been in existence for just over 10 years.

Womans I XI - NL Division 1
Womans II XI - West District Division 2
Womans III XI - West District Division 3

References

http://www.westernwildcats.co.uk/pages/page_11870/GeneralHistory19742009.aspx

External links

Scottish field hockey clubs
Sport in East Dunbartonshire
Sports teams in Glasgow
Field hockey clubs established in 1898
1898 establishments in Scotland
Organisations based in East Dunbartonshire